William "Ernie" Owen was a former Australian professional soccer player who last played as a full-back for Wallsend, Speers Point and the Australia national soccer team.

Club career
After Owen progressed from his junior career at Mazeppas in 1919, he joined Wallsend from 1920 to 1928. He joined Speers Points in a brief stint in the year of 1928.

International career
Owen began his international career with Australia in June 1923 on their second historic tour against New Zealand, debuting in a 1–4 loss to New Zealand. He played two more matches for Australia against Canada men's national soccer team resulting in a 4–1 win and a 0–0 draw.

Career statistics

International

References

Australian soccer players
Association football midfielders
Australia international soccer players